Oldcastle may refer to:

Places
Oldcastle, Bridgend, Wales
Oldcastle, Cheshire, England
Oldcastle, County Meath, Ireland
Oldcastle, Monmouthshire, Wales
Oldcastle, Ontario, Canada

People with the surname
Sir John Oldcastle, a supporter of the Lollards in the 15th century
Sir John Oldcastle, a play about him

Other uses
Oldcastle Revolt, a revolt led by John Oldcastle

See also 
Old Castle (disambiguation)